The 2021 Paris–Roubaix was a road cycling one-day race that took place on 3 October 2021 in France. It was the 118th edition of Paris–Roubaix and the 28th event of the 2021 UCI World Tour. The race was won by Italian Sonny Colbrelli in a sprint finish.

Teams
All nineteen UCI WorldTeams and six UCI ProTeams participated to the race. Of the twenty-five teams, only  did not compete with the maximum allowed seven riders. 96 of the 174 riders to start the race finished.

UCI WorldTeams

 
 
 
 
 
 
 
 
 
 
 
 
 
 
 
 
 
 
 

UCI ProTeams

Summary 
Originally scheduled to take place on 11 April 2021, the race was postponed due to the COVID-19 pandemic in France. The planned race in 2020 was also cancelled due to the pandemic. For the first time, Paris–Roubaix Femmes was held, taking place the day before the men's race.

Italy's Sonny Colbrelli won the race in a three-man sprint ahead of Florian Vermeersch and Mathieu van der Poel. It was the first time an Italian cyclist had won the race since Andrea Tafi won the 1999 edition. The Paris–Roubaix weekend was wet and rainy, for the first time for nearly 20 years.

Result

References

Paris-Roubaix
Paris-Roubaix
Paris-Roubaix
Paris–Roubaix
Paris-Roubaix